Hall v Woolston Hall Leisure Ltd [2000] EWCA Civ 170 is a UK labour law case, concerning the illegality in the contract of employment.

Facts
Mrs Hall was dismissed from being head chef at the Epping Forest Golf Club because she became pregnant. She claimed unfair dismissal based on the Equal Treatment Directive 76/207/EC and the Sex Discrimination Act 1975 (now the Equality Act 2010). However, in September 1994, she had received a raise to £250 and her payslip still showed £250 gross and £186.65 net, which apparently demonstrated tax avoidance. She asked and was told “It’s the way we do business.” For five months she continued to work. The employer argued that because Mrs Hall was party to an illegal contract, she was not entitled to bring a claim for unfair dismissal.

The Tribunal held that Mrs Hall could not bring a discrimination claim, because she turned a blind eye to the Inland Revenue being defrauded. It held it could make a limited award of compensation, but not for financial loss.

Judgment
The Court of Appeal held that Mrs Hall could bring her claim. Peter Gibson LJ held that her contract was initially lawful and she did not actively participate in the illegality. Her acquiescence was not causally linked to her sex discrimination. Public policy did not preclude her entitlement to a statutory claim under SDA 1975 ss 65 and 66. Moreover, the Equal Treatment Directive 76/207/EC was clearly contravened, and a remedy must be effective to fulfill the purpose embodied in the Directive.

Mance LJ held that mere knowledge by the employee of the illegality is not enough. The employee must have actively participated in the illegality rather than have merely acquiesced in an employer's unlawful conduct.

Moore-Bick J, concurred.

See also

UK labour law
Hounga v Allen And Another [2014] UKSC 47

Notes

References

United Kingdom labour case law